The fourth season of 30 Rock, an American television comedy series, consists of 22 episodes and began airing on October 15, 2009, on the NBC network in the United States. The season was produced by Broadway Video, Little Stranger, and NBC Universal; the executive producers were series creator Tina Fey, Lorne Michaels, Marci Klein, David Miner, and Robert Carlock.

30 Rock is centered on The Girlie Show with Tracy Jordan (TGS), a fictional sketch comedy series, and its head writer Liz Lemon, portrayed by Fey. The series follows Lemon as she juggles her job and her personal life. Early in the season Jack Donaghy (Alec Baldwin) and Liz work to find a new cast member for TGS. The season also sees NBC being purchased by Kabletown, a fictionalized depiction of the acquisition of NBC Universal by Comcast. Additionally, Liz has an ongoing relationship with a man she thought might be her "Future Husband" later in the season.

During the 2009–2010 upfront presentation on May 19, 2009, NBC announced that the show's fourth season, following the precedent set by its third season, would premiere several weeks behind the rest of the network's Thursday night lineup following a multi-week run of Saturday Night Live Weekend Update Thursday specials. On June 25, NBC released its full fall premiere schedule, with 30 Rock returning on October 15, 2009. The fourth season aired under NBC's promotional banner "Comedy Night Done Right" on Thursdays at 9:30 p.m. Eastern Time. The season drew 15 Primetime Emmy Award nominations, down from its previous record breaking totals of 17 and 22 in the second and third seasons, respectively. The season was released on DVD in the United States on September 21, 2010, as a three-disc set.

Synopsis
Season 4 continues with Liz's love advice proving to be a disaster for most of her male co-workers, while she meets someone who could be her love interest (Michael Sheen), despite being reluctant about it. She also attempts to buy an apartment located above hers. Meanwhile, Jack falls for two women and is forced to choose one of them - his high school sweetheart (Julianne Moore), or someone who is similarly successful as him (Elizabeth Banks) while trying to impress the Kabletown executives.
Tracy, yearning to be taken more seriously, tries to earn an EGOT while starring in the movie Hard to Watch and Jenna meets a new love interest who is also a straight drag queen (Will Forte) and meets her mother, Verna (Jan Hooks). However, things don't go well for Kenneth as certain events lead to endangering his job as an NBC page.

NBC's purchase by the Philadelphia-based cable company Kabletown, a fictionalized depiction of the acquisition of NBC Universal by Comcast that occurred during the season, becomes a recurring storyline. Fictional GE CEO Don Geiss (Rip Torn) dies. Jack assigns the TGS crew to search for a new cast member; Josh Girard (Lonny Ross) to quit but eventually try and fails to come back. Ultimately, the new cast member is Jack "Danny" Baker (Cheyenne Jackson).

The season culminates in the weddings of Cerie, Floyd, and Grizz, and with Liz dumping her boyfriend Wesley Snipes for pilot Carol Burnett.

Crew
The fourth season was produced by Broadway Video, Little Stranger, Inc., and Universal Media Studios and was aired on the NBC network. The executive producers were series creator Tina Fey, Lorne Michaels, Marci Klein, David Miner, and Robert Carlock. Jack Burditt, Matt Hubbard, Jeff Richmond, John Riggi, and Ron Weiner acted as co-executive producers. The producers for the season were Alec Baldwin, Jerry Kupfer, Paula Pell, and Don Scardino with Diana Schmidt, Irene Burns, and Kay Cannon as co-producers.

There were eight directors through the season, two of which—series producer Scardino and Beth McCarthy-Miller—directed multiple episodes. There were six directors who each directed a single episode of the season: Riggi, Gail Mancuso, Ken Whittingham, Stephen Lee Davis, Millicent Shelton, and Richmond. Writers credited with episodes in the fourth season included  Fey, Carlock, Riggi, Hubbard, Weiner, Dylan Morgan & Josh Siegal, Jon Haller & Tracey Wigfield, Burditt, and Pell.

Cast

Tina Fey portrayed Liz Lemon, the head writer of a fictitious live-sketch-comedy television series TGS. The TGS cast consists of two main actors. The lead actor is the loose cannon movie star Tracy Jordan, portrayed by Tracy Morgan. His co-star is the extremely narcissistic Jenna Maroney, portrayed by Jane Krakowski. Josh Girard, portrayed by Lonny Ross, was a cast member in previous seasons but quit TGS in "Season 4". Jack "Danny" Baker (Cheyenne Jackson) is a new cast member hired during the season to replace Girard. Jack McBrayer played the naïve NBC page Kenneth Parcell. Scott Adsit acted as the witty and wise TGS producer, Pete Hornberger. Judah Friedlander portrayed trucker hat-wearing staff writer Frank Rossitano. Alec Baldwin played the NBC network executive Jack Donaghy. Donaghy's full corporate title for the majority of the season is "Head of East Coast Television and Microwave Oven Programming". Keith Powell played the Harvard University alumnus and TGS staff writer James "Toofer" Spurlock. Katrina Bowden acted as writers' assistant Cerie Xerox. Other cast members include, Maulik Pancholy as Jonathan, Grizz Chapman as Grizz Griswold, Kevin Brown as "Dot Com" Slattery, and John Lutz as J.D. Lutz.

The show regularly features guest stars. Steve Buscemi plays private investigator Lenny Wosniak, while Will Arnett acts as Devon Banks, Jack's enemy. Cheyenne Jackson guest starred in this season as Danny Baker, the new cast member on TGS. Fey had seen Jackson in the Broadway musicals Xanadu and Damn Yankees, the latter starred Jane Krakowski. Fey set up a meeting with Jackson to interest him in a role on the program with him accepting. Bobb'e J. Thompson and Sherri Shepherd returned as Tracy Jr. and Angie Jordan, respectively, the son and wife of Tracy Jordan. Dr. Leo Spaceman was played by Chris Parnell. Julianne Moore and Elizabeth Banks appeared as Nancy Donovan and Avery Jessup, respectively, as love interests for Jack. Jan Hooks acts as Verna Maroney, Jenna's mother. Jon Hamm, Jason Sudeikis, and Dean Winters reprised their roles as Drew Baird, Floyd DeBarber, and Dennis Duffy, respectively, as former boyfriends of Liz. Michael Sheen portrays Wesley Snipes, a man who believes that he and Liz are destined for each other. Anita Gillette, Patti LuPone, and Elaine Stritch played Margaret Lemon, Sylvia Rossitano, and Colleen Donaghy, respectively, the mothers of Liz, Frank, and Jack, respectively. Matt Damon's character Carol is introduced as a love interest in the season finale.

Castings

Main cast
Tina Fey as Liz Lemon, the head writer of TGS, a live sketch comedy television show. (22 episodes)
Tracy Morgan as Tracy Jordan, a loose cannon movie star and cast member of TGS. (22 episodes)
Jane Krakowski as Jenna Maroney, a vain, fame-obsessed TGS cast member and Liz's best friend. (22 episodes)
Jack McBrayer as Kenneth Parcell, a naïve, television-loving NBC page from Georgia. (22 episodes)
Scott Adsit as Pete Hornberger, the witty and wise producer of TGS. (17 episodes)
Judah Friedlander as Frank Rossitano, an immature staff writer for TGS. (20 episodes)
Alec Baldwin as Jack Donaghy, a high-flying NBC network executive and Liz's mentor. (22 episodes)
Katrina Bowden as Cerie Xerox, the young, attractive TGS general assistant. (11 episodes)
Keith Powell as James "Toofer" Spurlock, a proud African-American staff writer for TGS. (15 episodes)
Lonny Ross as Josh Girard, a young, unintelligent TGS cast member. (2 episodes)
Kevin Brown as Walter "Dot Com" Slattery, a member of Tracy's entourage. (14 episodes)
Grizz Chapman as Warren "Grizz" Griswold, a member of Tracy's entourage. (12 episodes)
Maulik Pancholy as Jonathan, Jack's assistant who is obsessed with him. (9 episodes)
John Lutz as J.D. Lutz, a lazy, overweight TGS writer who is often ridiculed by his co-workers. (16 episodes)

Recurring cast
Sue Galloway as Sue LaRoche-Van der Hout, a TGS writer from the Netherlands. (8 episodes)
Elizabeth Banks as Avery Jessup, the host of NBC's political talk show The Hot-Box and love interest for Jack. (6 episodes)
Cheyenne Jackson as Danny Baker, a new TGS cast member. (6 episodes)
John Anderson as Astronaut Mike Dexter, Liz's fantasy boyfriend. (5 episodes)
Julianne Moore as Nancy Donovan, Jack's high school crush from Boston. (5 episodes)
 Marceline Hugot as Kathy Geiss, Don Geiss' socially awkward middle-aged daughter. (4 episodes)
Michael Sheen as Wesley Snipes, an Englishman who starts dating Liz. (4 episodes)
Jason Sudeikis as Floyd DeBarber, Liz's former boyfriend. (4 episodes)
Subhas Ramsaywack as Subhas, a janitor at 30 Rockefeller Plaza. (3 episodes)
Will Arnett as Devon Banks, a government employee and Jack's nemesis. (2 episodes)
Will Ferrell as Shane Hunter, the fictional protagonist in the television show Bitch Hunter. (2 episodes)
Will Forte as Paul L'astnamé, Jenna's boyfriend who is also a Jenna Maroney impersonator. (2 episodes)
Jon Hamm as Dr. Andrew "Drew" Baird, a pediatrician and Liz's ex-boyfriend. (2 episodes)
Jan Hooks as Verna Maroney, Jenna's manipulative mother. (2 episodes)
Chris Parnell as Dr. Leo Spaceman, a physician who practices questionable medical techniques. (2 episodes)
James Rebhorn as Dr. Kaplan, a dentist. (2 episodes)
Brian Williams as himself (2 episodes)
Dean Winters as Dennis Duffy, Liz's immature ex-boyfriend. (2 episodes)

Guest stars
Buzz Aldrin as himself (Episode: "The Moms")
Jon Bon Jovi as himself (Episode: "Anna Howard Shaw Day")
Steve Buscemi as Lenny Wosniak, a private investigator hired by Jack. (Episode: "Season 4")
Matt Damon as Carol Burnett, a pilot and love interest for Liz. (Episode: "I Do Do")
Jeff Dunham as Rick Wayne (Episode: "Stone Mountain")
Jimmy Fallon as himself (Episode: "Stone Mountain")
James Franco as himself (Episode: "Klaus and Greta")
Kathie Lee Gifford as herself (Episode: "Floyd")
Anita Gillette as Margaret Lemon, Liz's mother. (Episode: "The Moms")
Whoopi Goldberg as herself (Episode: "Dealbreakers Talk Show #0001")
Al Gore as himself (Episode: "Sun Tea")
Gilbert Gottfried as himself (voice role) [Episode: "Audition Day"]
Hoda Kotb as herself (Episode: "Floyd")
Lester Holt as himself (Episode: "Floyd")
Padma Lakshmi as herself (Episode: "The Problem Solvers")
Matt Lauer as himself (Episode: "Klaus and Greta")
Shawn Levy as Scottie Shofar, a television producer. (Episode: "The Problem Solvers")
Patti LuPone as Sylvia Rossitano, Frank's stereotypical Italian-American mother. (Episode: "The Moms")
Novella Nelson as herself (Episode: "The Moms")
Paula Pell as Paula Hornberger, Pete's wife. (Episode: "Season 4")
Alysia Reiner as Real Estate Agent (Episode: "Sun Tea")
Horatio Sanz as Maynard Roger Hoynes, Jenna's stalker. (Episode: "Anna Howard Shaw Day")
Martin Scorsese as himself (voice role) [Episode: "Audition Day"]
Sherri Shepherd as Angie Jordan, Tracy's no-nonsense wife. (Episode: "Dealbreakers Talk Show #0001")
Elaine Stritch as Colleen Donaghy, Jack's cold and overbearing mother. (Episode: "The Moms")
Christopher Walken as himself (voice role) [Episode: "Audition Day"]
Jack Welch as himself (Episode: "Future Husband")
Betty White as herself (Episode: "Stone Mountain")
Larry Wilcox as himself (Episode: "Secret Santa")
Meredith Viera as herself (Episode: "Floyd")

Episodes

Reception

Critical reception
On Rotten Tomatoes, the season has an approval rating of 72% with an average score of 7.5 out of 10 based on 36 reviews. The website's critical consensus reads, "Though a tad uneven and perhaps a victim of its own success, '30 Rocks fourth season nevertheless continues to deliver plenty of subversive satire and hearty laughs." Robert Canning of IGN scored this season an 8.4 out of 10 rating, noting it was "impressive" and that 30 Rock "is no longer a fresh new series and a bit of the Season 4 doldrums could be felt mid season. But the great start and fantastic finish proved that there's still a lot of great comedy to be found on the stages of 30 Rock." Aaron Barnhart of The Kansas City Star deemed the first episode of the season, "Season 4" as "one of the weakest" episodes from 30 Rock that he has ever seen, and found the episode boring. In his review of the third episode, "Stone Mountain", Leonard Pierce of The A.V. Club gave it a "C" grade, and not entirely favorable to the first two episodes, Pierce commented that 30 Rock "needs to give us something fast to get rid of the worst-season-ever stink that's starting to gather."

DVD Talk's Ryan Keefer opined that the fourth season was a "drop in form" from the show's previous seasons. IGN contributor Dan Iverson, reviewing the DVD release, wrote "There aren't many shows on television that are as consistently funny as 30 Rock [...] Not content to rest on silly characters and smart gags ... the show brought in new characters and created story arcs which made the season worth watching from beginning to the end." Iverson deemed the premiere and "Into the Crevasse" as "two excellent episodes" from the season. Metacritic, which gives a score based on critical reviews, gave this season of 30 Rock a rating of 74% from 17 reviews, signifying "generally favorable."

Ratings
The fourth season premiere, "Season 4", attracted 6.4 million American viewers, down from the 8.7 million that viewed the third season premiere. However, the second episode, "Into the Crevasse", showed some improvement, garnering 6.7 million viewers. The seventeenth episode of the season, "Lee Marvin vs. Derek Jeter", became the lowest-rated episode of the series in the United States, with 4.0 million viewers watching. Until that point, the first season episodes "Jack the Writer" and "Hard Ball" had been the lowest-rated episodes, having both drawn 4.6 million. Finally, the season finale "I Do Do" was seen by 5.5 million viewers, a slight decrease on the third season finale, "Kidney Now!", which had been seen by 5.7 million. Overall, the season averaged 5.9 million viewers, ranking eighty-sixth for the year, according to Nielsen Media Research.

Awards and nominations
At the 67th Golden Globe Awards in January 2010, Alec Baldwin won his second Golden Globe Award in the category of Best Performance by an Actor in a Television Series (Comedy or Musical), for his portrayal of Jack Donaghy. Both Baldwin and Tina Fey won the Screen Actors Guild Awards in the categories of Outstanding Performance by a Male Actor in a Comedy Series and Outstanding Performance by a Female Actor in a Comedy Series, respectively.

This season of 30 Rock received 15 Emmy Award nominations, including the series' fourth consecutive nominations for Outstanding Comedy Series, Outstanding Lead Actor in a Comedy Series (Baldwin), and Outstanding Lead Actress in a Comedy Series (Fey). This total was down from the 17 nominations for season 2 and 22 for season 3. Guest appearances by Jon Hamm, Will Arnett, and Elaine Strich all also drew nominations in their respective categories. The ceremony saw the series fail to win any of the awards for which it had been nominated.

Distribution
The series is broadcast in Canada, the United Kingdom, and Australia, in addition to the United States. It was simulcast in Canada on Citytv. This season of 30 Rock was shown in Australia on the Seven Network at 11:30 p.m. local time starting February 1, 2010. The fourth season began in the UK on April 19, 2010, on Comedy Central.

The season was released on DVD by Universal Studios on September 21, 2010, in the United States after it had completed an initial broadcast run on NBC. The three-disc set of 22 episodes has a 1.78:1 aspect ratio, Dolby Surround 2.0 and 5.1, and English and Spanish subtitles. In addition to the episodes, the DVD set special features included unaired scenes, featurettes, and audio commentary on the select episodes, "Stone Mountain", "Audition Day", "The Problem Solvers", "Dealbreakers Talk Show #0001", "Black Light Attack", "Verna", "Anna Howard Shaw Day", and "Don Geiss, America and Hope".

References

External links

 
 

 
2009 American television seasons
2010 American television seasons